The 1901 Wellington City mayoral election was part of the New Zealand local elections held that same year. In 1901, elections were held for the Mayor of Wellington plus other local government positions including twelve city councillors. John Aitken, the incumbent Mayor, was re-elected to office as Mayor of Wellington, beating Thomas Wilford. The polling was conducted using the standard first-past-the-post electoral method.

Electoral reforms were implemented in 1901, which extended the municipal term to biennial terms and saw the abolition of the ward system, implementing the process of electing councillors at large instead.

Mayoralty results

Councillor results

Notes

References

Mayoral elections in Wellington
1901 elections in New Zealand
Politics of the Wellington Region
April 1901 events
1900s in Wellington